The Wish You Were Here Tour, also referred to as the North American Tour, was a concert tour by the British progressive rock band Pink Floyd in 1975 in support of their then-forthcoming album Wish You Were Here. The tour was divided in two legs in the United States, West Coast and East Coast, and a gig in the UK at the Knebworth Festival.

On this tour debuted the song "Have a Cigar" and the "Shine On You Crazy Diamond" suite was divided in two parts with "Have a Cigar" between.

The last gig of the tour was as the headliner of 1975 Knebworth Festival, which also featured Steve Miller Band, Captain Beefheart and Roy Harper (who joined Pink Floyd on the stage to sing "Have a Cigar"). Knebworth was the last time the band would perform "Echoes" and the entire The Dark Side of the Moon album with Roger Waters.

Setlist

The band performed two sets for the tour. The first set were songs from Wish You Were Here while the following album Animals, were performed under working titles. The second set consisted the entire The Dark Side of the Moon album with "Echoes" performed as an encore.

First set
"Raving and Drooling" (early version of "Sheep")
"You've Got to Be Crazy" (early version of "Dogs")
"Shine On You Crazy Diamond, Parts I-V"
"Have a Cigar"
"Shine On You Crazy Diamond, Parts VI-IX"
Second set
 "Speak to Me"
 "Breathe"
 "On the Run"
 "Time/Breathe (Reprise)"
 "The Great Gig in the Sky"
 "Money"
 "Us and Them"
 "Any Colour You Like"
 "Brain Damage"
 "Eclipse"

Encore
"Echoes"

Tour dates

Personnel
David Gilmour – vocals, guitar 
Roger Waters – bass, vocals
Richard Wright – keyboards, vocals
Nick Mason – drums
Additional musicians
Dick Parry – saxophone
The Blackberries (Venetta Fields & Carlena Williams) – backing vocals

References

Citations

Sources

External links
Brain Damage.co.uk

Pink Floyd concert tours
1975 concert tours